Sir Thomas Herbert Maddock (18 May 1792 – 15 January 1870) was a British civil servant in India and a  Conservative politician  who sat in the House of Commons from 1852 to 1857.

Life

Maddock was the son of the Rev. Thomas Maddock and Emily Anne Scott, daughter of Rokeby Scott of Chester. He was educated at Manchester School. In 1811, he entered the Civil Service of the East India Company's Bengal Presidency. In 1822, Maddock clumsily breached the Great Stupa at Sanchi, although he was not able to reach the center, and he then abandoned.

He was Secretary to the Government of India from 1838 to 1843, and was knighted by patent on 25 April 1844. From 1845 to 1849 he was Deputy Governor of Bengal and President of the Council of India.

Maddock was elected at the 1852 general election as a Member of Parliament (MP) for Rochester, but did not stand again in 1857.
 
Maddock died in London aged 77 and was buried in Highgate Cemetery.

References

External links 
 

1792 births
1870 deaths
Burials at Highgate Cemetery
Conservative Party (UK) MPs for English constituencies
UK MPs 1852–1857